Dodo-Ichyotuy (Doodo Üshöötei) is a rural locality (a selo) in Dzhidinsky District, Republic of Buryatia, Russia. The population was 350 as of 2017. There are 61 streets.

Geography 
Dodo-Ichyotuy is located 11 km east of Petropavlovka (the district's administrative centre) by road. Petropavlovka is the nearest rural locality.

References 

Rural localities in Dzhidinsky District